Hockey Club Dinamo Saint Petersburg, is a Russian professional ice hockey club based in Saint Petersburg, Russia. They are members of the Supreme Hockey League (VHL) and they have a farm team in the Junior Hockey League (MHL) as well as a women's team in the Zhenskaya Hockey League (ZhHL), called Dinamo-Neva Saint Petersburg.

Their main sponsor is the Wingas company.

History
The club was established in 1946, but never reached over the 5th position in the Soviet Championship League.

During the Soviet era, Dinamo belonged to the Ministry of Internal Affairs sports club system and consisted of Leningrad police officers.

In 1971, the club was dissolved and reestablished in 2013 as a junior hockey club.

Honors
  Petrov Cup (1): 2018 Winner

See also
FC Dynamo Saint Petersburg
BC Dynamo Saint Petersburg

External links
Official Website of HC Dinamo Saint Petersburg 

Ice hockey teams in Russia
Sports clubs in Saint Petersburg
Dynamo sports society
Junior Hockey League (Russia) teams